Lost in the Bush is a 1973 Australian film based on the true story of three siblings who got lost in the Victorian bush for several days in 1864. They were discovered through the help of some aboriginal trackers including Dick-a-Dick.

Cast
Gabrielle Bulle as Jane Cooper
Colin Freckleton as Isaac Cooper
Richard McClelland as Frank Duff
Adrian Crick
Barbara Maroske
Don Mitchell
Bill Tregonning

Production
The film was made for schools by the Victorian government. Shooting began in February 1972 near the Wimmera town of Horsham.

References

External links

Australian thriller drama films
1970s English-language films
1970s Australian films